The Twin Peaks are two sharply defined peaks,  high, standing together  north of Mount Taylor and  west of the head of Hope Bay at the north-east end of the Antarctic Peninsula. They were discovered by the Swedish Antarctic Expedition, 1901–04, under Otto Nordenskiöld, and named by the Falkland Islands Dependencies Survey following their survey of the area in 1946.

References
 

Mountains of Trinity Peninsula
Geography of the British Antarctic Territory